The 2016 Campbell Fighting Camels football team represented Campbell University in the 2016 NCAA Division I FCS football season. They were led by fourth-year head coach Mike Minter and played their home games at Barker–Lane Stadium. They were members of the Pioneer Football League. They finished the season 5–5, 3–4 in PFL play to finish in sixth place.

Schedule

 The game between Campbell and Jacksonville was postponed in advance of the arrival of Hurricane Matthew. The game was subsequently cancelled.
Source: Schedule

Game summaries

Bluefield

at Chowan

Presbyterian

Butler

at Marist

at Jacksonville
Game was canceled due to Hurricane Matthew.

Stetson

at Drake

Davidson

at Morehead State

San Diego

References

Campbell
Campbell Fighting Camels football seasons
Campbell Fighting Camels football